John Northmore (died 1415/16), of Taunton, Somerset, was a wool and cloth merchant.

He was a Member of Parliament for Taunton in September 1397 and 1407.

References

14th-century births
1416 deaths
14th-century English people
15th-century English people
People from Taunton
English MPs September 1397
English MPs 1407
Year of birth missing
Place of death missing